The 2002 Temple Owls football team represented Temple University in the college 2002 NCAA Division I-A football season. The Owls competed as a member of the Big East Conference, and the team was coached by Bobby Wallace.

Schedule

Roster

Team players in the NFL

References

Temple
Temple Owls football seasons
Temple Owls football